Barbatos is the 8th spirit named among the list of 72 demons in The Lesser Key of Solomon. According to grimoire tradition, he holds the rank of Duke, and (like the demon Buer) may appear when the sun is in the sign of Sagittarius. When summoned, he appears "with four noble kings and their companions in great troops". Barbatos grants the ability to understand the spoken language of animals, such as the singing of birds and the barking of dogs. He reveals hidden treasures that have been concealed by the enchantment of magicians, gives knowledge of past and future events, and reconciles disputes between friends and those who hold power. Barbatos has 30 legions of spirits under his command, and once belonged to the angelic order of Virtues.

In the Grand Grimoire, Barbatos is named as the 6th of the 18 spirits who serve the seven superior spirits, namely, he is under the command of Satanachia along with Pruslas and Aamon.

In popular culture
 In the anime series Mobile Suit Gundam: Iron-Blooded Orphans, the lead mobile suit is known as "ASW-G-08 Gundam Barbatos".
 In the 2020 game Genshin Impact, Barbatos is one of the names of the Anemo (wind) Archon and god of the nation Mondstadt who currently resides in his vessel as Venti, a bard.
 In the Japanese Otome game, Obey Me, there is a character named Barbatos who serves as a butler to the prince.
 In American superhero comics published by DC, a character named Barbatos appears as a villain in the Dark Nights: Metal story.
 In the strategy game Monster Legends, a monster named Barbatos was the ruler of hell before being dethroned by Nebotus.

References

Goetic demons